Peninsular Railroad or Peninsular Railway may refer to:
Peninsular Railroad (Florida), a predecessor of the Seaboard Air Line Railroad
Peninsular Railway (Illinois–Indiana–Michigan), a predecessor of the Grand Trunk Western Railroad
Peninsular Railroad (Indiana), a predecessor of the above
Peninsular Railway (California), an interurban subsidiary of the Southern Pacific Company

See also
 Peninsula Railroad (disambiguation)